The Hippie Family (La familia hippie) is a 1971 Argentine musical comedy film by Enrique Carreras. It stars Ángel Magaña and Palito Ortega. Not being a movie about 'hippies' as such, the title refers to the portrayal of a family in which mother and daughter are pregnant simultaneously. The movie is a remake of the 1955 production La Cigüeña dijo sí, both films are based on a play by Carlos Llopis.

Cast
Ángel Magaña  		
Palito Ortega 			
Liliana Abayieva 			
Tono Andreu 		
Joe Borsani 	 		
Olinda Bozán 	 		
Elina Colomer 	 		
Carlos Fioriti 	 				
Estela Molly		
Ernesto Raquén 	 		
Paquita Vehil

References

External links
 

1971 films
Argentine musical comedy films
1970s Spanish-language films
Remakes of Argentine films
1970s musical comedy films
1971 comedy films
1970s Argentine films
Films directed by Enrique Carreras